Demy is a surname. Notable persons with that name include:

 Jacques Demy (1931–1990), French film director
 Marie Demy (born 1994), Belgian badminton player
 Mathieu Demy (born 1972), French actor, film director and producer
 Valentine Demy (born 1963), Italian actress

See also
Michèle Demys (born 1943), French athlete